Ambrines is a commune in the Pas-de-Calais department in northern France.

Geography
A farming village located 12miles (19 km) west of Arras, at the D8 and D54 road junction.

Population

Sights
 The church of St.Leger, dating from the eighteenth century.
 A nineteenth-century chateau.

See also
Communes of the Pas-de-Calais department

References

Communes of Pas-de-Calais